Richard Bennett (1608 – 12 April 1675) was an English planter and Governor of the Colony of Virginia, serving 1652–1655. He had first come to the colony in 1629 to represent his uncle Edward Bennett's business interests, managing his plantation known as Bennett's Welcome in Warrascoyack (later known as Isle of Wight County).

Bennett also acquired his own land patents, ultimately owning and developing thousands of acres in Virginia and Maryland. He settled with other Puritans in Nansemond. There he and others later converted to become Quakers under the influence of George Fox. In 1665 he acquired 2500 acres at what is known as Bennett's Adventure, developing a plantation on Wicomico Creek in Wicomico County, Maryland.

Biography
Born in Wiveliscombe, Somerset in 1608 and christened 6 August 1609, Bennett served as governor from 30 April 1652, until 2 March 1655. His uncle, Edward Bennett, was a wealthy merchant from London and one of the few Puritan members of the Virginia Company. He received a land patent in 1621 and developed a plantation in Warrascoyack. He was helped by his brothers Robert, who managed it until his death in 1624, and Richard, who took over management but died himself in 1626. Edward Bennett went out to the colony himself and represented his plantation in the House of Burgesses in 1628, returning to England the following year.

Richard Bennett succeeded his uncle in Virginia to represent his business interests, and quickly rose to prominence. He represented his plantation in the House of Burgesses in 1629 and 1631 Bennett became leader of the small Puritan community south of the James River, taking them from Warrasquyoake to Nansemond beginning in 1635. Warrasquyoake was renamed as Isle of Wight County in 1637.

Bennett was a member of the Governor Francis Wyatt's Council in 1639–42. In 1648, under political and religious pressure during the English Civil War, he fled to Anne Arundel, Maryland.

Governor William Berkeley had been sympathetic to the Crown during the English Civil War. But on 12 March 1652, he surrendered to representatives of the Commonwealth.

Bennett, having returned to Virginia, was unanimously elected as governor on 30 April by the House of Burgesses. Though little is known about his time as governor, it is believed that he was popular with the colonists. While Governor of Virginia, he also spent much time directing affairs in Maryland colony. He negotiated there with the Susquehannock tribe (which spoke an Iroquoian language) and signed a treaty with them on 5 July 1652. Under this, they ceded their claims to "all the land lying from the Patuxent River unto Palmer's Island on the western side of the bay of Chesapeake, and from Choptank River to the northeast branch which lies to the northward of Elk River on the eastern side of the bay." (Some of this area continued to be claimed by the Nanticoke Indian Tribe, however, which was an Algonquian-speaking tribe, with a different culture.)

During the English Civil War, Bennett helped ensure Puritan control over the colony of Maryland. On 30 March 1655, he voluntarily abandoned his office and left for England to see Oliver Cromwell.

On 30 November 1657, Bennett, having returned to the colonies, signed the treaty with Cecilius Calvert, 2nd Baron Baltimore, which recognised the latter's claim to Maryland. He returned to the governor's Council in Virginia, and also was commissioned as a major-general.

In 1665 Bennett patented 2500 acres on the north bank of Wicomico Creek, in what is now Wicomico County, Maryland. The plantation became known as Bennett's Adventure, and a house built by the next owner in the eighteenth century is still standing. The property was listed in 1975 on the National Register of Historic Places.

Bennett led English colonial forces in 1667 against a marauding Dutch fleet of four vessels committing depredations at Hampton Roads.

In 1672, George Fox, founder of the Quaker movement, visited the Virginia Puritans in Nansemond. He converted most of them to his faith, including Bennett.

Family
Richard Bennett is thought to be a son of Thomas Bennett (1570–1616) and Antsie Tomson of Wiveliscombe, Somerset.  In 1666, Secretary Thomas Ludwell wrote to Henry Bennet, 1st Earl of Arlington that Richard Bennett seemed to be of the same family, sharing the same coat of arms (also shared by the Bennetts of North Bavant, Wiltshire). Biographer John Boddie, however, discounted the accuracy of the report.

By 1642, Richard Bennett married Mrs. Mary Ann Utie, the widow of John Utie, Sr. (There is no documentary evidence for Mary Ann's maiden name.) 
Their children were:
 Richard Bennett Jr., married Henrietta Maria Neale, daughter of James Neale and his wife of Maryland; drowned on his property May 1667.
 Anna Bennett (died November 1687), first married Theodorick Bland of Westover in 1660 and had three sons: Theodorick Bland, Richard Bland (who had many notable descendants), and John Bland, great-grandfather of Chancellor Theodorick Bland of Maryland. Her second marriage was to Col. St. Leger Codd, and they had one son, also named St. Leger Codd.
 Elizabeth Bennett, married Col. Charles Scarborough of Accomac County, the son of Edmund Scarborough and his wife

Bennett's descendants include Richard Bland II, John Randolph of Roanoke, Henry Lee III, Robert E. Lee, and Roger Atkinson Pryor.

See also
 Colony of Virginia
 Governor's Palace
 List of colonial governors of Virginia
 History of Virginia
 Bennett's Adventure

Literature
 Claus Bernet: Bennett, Richard (1609–1675), in: Biographisch-Bibliographisches Kirchenlexikon, vol. 35, Nordhausen 2014, Sp. 43–45.

References

1609 births
1675 deaths
People from Wiveliscombe
House of Burgesses members
Colonial governors of Virginia
English emigrants